A rural municipality (RM) is a type of incorporated municipality in the Canadian province of Manitoba. Manitoba has 98 RMs, which had a cumulative population of 301,438 as of the 2016 Census. This is a decrease from 116 RMs prior to January 1, 2015, when municipalities with less than 1,000 people were directed by the provincial government to amalgamate with adjoining municipalities to comply with the Municipal Act.

The most and least populated RMs as of the 2016 census are Hanover and Victoria Beach with populations of 15,733 and 398 respectively.

List 

Notes
 *Municipal or administrative offices are located in an adjacent independent city, town or village that is outside the jurisdiction of the rural municipality.

Former rural municipalities

Notes

See also 
List of local urban districts in Manitoba
List of communities in Manitoba
List of ghost towns in Manitoba
List of municipalities in Manitoba
List of cities in Manitoba
List of towns in Manitoba
List of villages in Manitoba
Amalgamation of Winnipeg
Manitoba municipal amalgamations, 2015
List of rural municipalities in Saskatchewan

References

External links 
 Manitoba Historical Society - Manitoba Municipalities
 Government of Manitoba Community Profiles:
 Regional Map (archived).
 Census Divisions Map.
 Municipality Profiles.

 
Municipalities